Songs from a Blackbird is the second studio album by Norwegian singer-songwriter Marion Raven (credited as Marion Ravn), first released in Norway on April 5, 2013. This album marks her first release in six years since 2007's Set Me Free and her first studio album in eight years composed entirely of brand new songs since 2005's Here I Am. Songs from a Blackbird also showcased Marion's musical transition from her past hard rock style into a softer folk-rock music.

Her music transition received mixed reaction especially from fans. Some condemned her for leaving behind her hard-rock style, while some praised her for making an effort to regain her album sales in Norway. Artists like Thom Hell and Lisa Miskovsky made duets with Raven in this album. Songs from a Blackbird peaked at No. 3 on the Norwegian charts.

In order to promote the album, Raven embarked on a nationwide Norwegian tour. Other than performing her new tracks during the concert, Raven also performed her previous tracks but rearranged the music with a more folk-rock touch.

Track listing

Songs From a Blackbird (Re-release)
A new version of Songs From a Blackbird has released on iTunes worldwide. The album contains 6 new tracks from both Scandal Vol. 1("Scandal", "In Dreams" and "Never Gonna Get It" ) and Scandal Vol. 2("Better Than This", "Running" and "When You Come Around"). The album was released under Epic Records and Sony Music Germany. The album will be for sale in formats CD and LP on August 8 in Germany, Switzerland and Austria.

Marion released under her international stage name, Marion Raven, instead Marion Ravn as she's well known in her home country, Norway. As in Norway, the first international single will be "The Minute", and a new music video was recorded in June in Germany. The music video was released on July 22, 2014.

iTunes album contains 3 bonus tracks, "Start Over", "You And I" and "Don't You" and released on August 5, 2014, for worldwide.

Songs from a Blackbird was released digitally and physically in Australia October 31, 2014.

New track listing

Charts

References

External links

http://www.marionraven.de/musik/

2013 albums
2014 albums
Marion Raven albums